No Sir, Nihilism Is Not Practical is an album by the band Showbread. A music video was made for the song "Mouth Like A Magazine".

Track listing
All songs written by Josh Dies.
 "A Llama Eats a Giraffe (And Vice Versa)" – 3:51
 "Dead By Dawn" – 3:54
 "Mouth Like a Magazine" – 4:12
 "If You Like Me Check Yes, If You Don't I'll Die" – 3:20
 "Sampsa Meets Kafka" – 1:10
 "So Selfish It's Funny" – 4:28
 "The Missing Wife" – 4:47
 "Welcome to Plainfield Tobe Hooper" – 3:17
 "And the Smokers And Children Shall Be Cast Down" – 5:07
 "Stabbing Art To Death"  – 6:46
 "The Dissonance of Discontent" 3:00
 "Matthias Replaces Judas"   – 5:03
 "The Bell Jar" – 5:19

Personnel
Showbread
Matt Davis - Guitar
Josh Dies - Lead vocals, Guitar, Synthesizer, Programming, Composer
John Giddens - Synthesizer
Mike Jensen - Guitar
Ivory Mobley - Lead vocals
Patrick Porter - Bass
Marvin Reilly - Drums

Additional Musicians
Reese Roper - Vocals
Sylvia Massy Shivy - Vocals, Mellotron, Theremin

Production:
Troy Glessner - Mastering
Sylvia Massy Shivy - Producer, Mixing
David Stuart - Photography
Rich Veltrop - Engineering

Reception
In 2004, Revolver Magazine called No Sir, Nihilism Is Not Practical, "Best Post-Hardcore Album of the Year".

References

Showbread (band) albums
2004 albums
Tooth & Nail Records albums
Reese Roper albums
Solid State Records albums
Albums produced by Sylvia Massy